Bač is a village northeast of Knežak in the Municipality of Ilirska Bistrica in the Inner Carniola region of Slovenia.

Name
The name Bač is related to the Slovene common noun beč '(stone- or wood-lined) hollow with a spring' (< *bъťъ), referring to a local geographical feature. The Slavic word *bъťъ was borrowed from Latin buttis 'barrel' and is also the origin of the Slovene toponyms Beč and Buč.

Kalec Castle
The ruins of Kalec Castle (also Na Kalcu;  or Stemberg) stand northwest of Bač near the sources of the Pivka River. The castle was built in 1620, and a cylindrical tower and walled courtyard were later added. The property was owned by the Wilicher family. The tower was restored in 1939, and the rest of the structure is in ruins.

Church
The local church in the settlement is dedicated to Saint Anne and belongs to the Parish of Knežak.

References

External links 
Bač on Geopedia

Populated places in the Municipality of Ilirska Bistrica